Apache Shiro (pronounced "sheeroh", a Japanese word for castle ) is an open source software security framework that performs authentication, authorization, cryptography and session management.  Shiro has been designed to be an intuitive and easy-to-use framework while still providing robust security features.

History
Shiro's predecessor, JSecurity, was founded in 2004 by Les Hazlewood and Jeremy Haile because they could not find a suitable Java security framework that operated well at the application level and they were frustrated with JAAS.  Between 2004 and 2008, JSecurity was hosted on SourceForge and its committer list grew to include Peter Ledbrook, Alan Ditzel, Tim Veil.

In 2008, JSecurity project was submitted to the Apache Software Foundation (ASF) and accepted into their Incubator Program to be stewarded by mentors in order to become a top level Apache Project.  Under the ASF's Incubator, Jsecurity was renamed Ki (pronounced Key) and shortly later renamed Shiro by the community because of trademark concerns.

The project continued to grow while in the Apache Incubator, adding Kalle Korhonen as a project committer.  And in July 2010, the Shiro community released its official version 1.0, marking a period of stability in the code base.  Following the release of version 1.0, the Shiro community created a Project Management Committee and elected Les Hazlewood as its chair.  On September 22, 2010, Shiro became a top level project (TLP) in the Apache Software Foundation.

Releases 
 1.8.0 on 2021-08-26 (current release)
 1.7.1 on 2021-01-31
 1.7.0 on 2020-10-29
 1.6.0 on 2020-08-17
 1.5.3 on 2020-05-03
 1.5.2 on 2020-03-23
 1.5.1 on 2020-02-23
 1.5.0 on 2020-01-24
 1.4.2 on 2019-11-18
 1.4.1 on 2019-04-18
 1.4.0 on 2017-05-05
 1.3.2 on 2016-09-11
 1.3.1 on 2016-08-29
 1.3.0 on 2016-07-25
 1.2.6 on 2016-06-28
 1.2.5 on 2016-05-24
 1.2.4 on 2015-07-07
 1.2.3 on 2014-02-25
 1.2.2 on 2013-05-15
 1.2.1 on 2012-07-28
 1.2.0 on 2012-01-24
 1.1.0 on 2010-11-01

See also 
 Application security
 Java Authentication and Authorization Service (JAAS)
 Enterprise JavaBean#Security EJB Container-Managed Security
 JGuard, an LGPL-licensed security framework
 Spring Security, an Apache-licensed Java security framework

References

External links
 

Shiro
Free security software
Java (programming language) libraries
Java enterprise platform
Computer access control frameworks